Dendrocousinsia alpina is a species of plant in the family Euphorbiaceae. It is endemic to eastern Jamaica.

References

Hippomaneae
Vulnerable plants
Endemic flora of Jamaica
Taxonomy articles created by Polbot